Times of Grace is the sixth studio album by Californian band Neurosis, released on May 4, 1999. It continued the band's development of the post-metal genre and demonstrates gothic rock and progressive rock influences. This album and Grace, an ambient companion by the band's alter-ego Tribes of Neurot, are designed to play alongside each other. Times of Grace marked the beginning of the band's ongoing working relationship with recording engineer Steve Albini.

Background and composition

In 1996, Neurosis released Through Silver in Blood to critical and popular acclaim. Following extensive touring, the band returned to the studio in October 1998 to begin Times of Grace. As the band's debut release featuring the production of Steve Albini, who would become a regular Neurosis collaborator, Times of Grace has been called "the first album where Neurosis started to sound like Neurosis." Numerous publications praised Albini's work on the album, highlighting the weight and immersion of the production. The album has a natural and unrefined sound, and Albini's work both preserved and accentuated that organic quality.

Critical reception

Times of Grace received positive reviews. AllMusic writer Eduardo Rivadavia praised the album, saying, "With time and patience, Times of Grace may prove one of the group's most satisfying works for long-time converts, but it will most likely seem too exhausting to the uninitiated." Writing for The A.V. Club, Joshua Klein highly appreciated the work of Steve Albini, who gave a good sound quality to the album, but even higher he appreciated the Neurosis musicians themselves, who had done hard work with the "labyrinthine arrangements". Greg Moffitt of the BBC wrote, "Replete with heaviness every bit as devastating as its belligerent brother, this album’s effortless ebb and flow and kaleidoscopic spectrum of eerie tones lend it a dazzling, cinematic quality." Stereogum ranked Times of Grace as Neurosis's best album, calling it "very, very heavy."

Accolades

Track listing

Personnel
Neurosis
Scott Kelly − guitar, vocals, percussion
Steve Von Till − guitar, vocals, percussion
Dave Edwardson − bass, backing vocals, Moog synthesizer
Jason Roeder − drums, percussion
Noah Landis − keyboard, samples, synthesizer, vocals

Additional musicians
 John Goff − bagpipes
 Jackie Gratz − cello
 Jon Birdsong − cornet, tuba
 Wendy-O Matik − narrator
 Johannes Mager − trombone
 Kris Force − viola, violin

Grace

Grace is the third studio album by Californian dark ambient band Tribes of Neurot, a side project of Neurosis. Created at the same time as Times of Grace by the same people, the two albums are overlapping companions meant to be played simultaneously. In 2009, Neurot Recordings released Times of Grace and Grace as one 2xCD package.

Background and composition

From its inception, Grace was intended to be played alongside the 1999 Neurosis album Times of Grace. About this simultaneity, the band wrote:

Grace is composed mainly of sounds from Times of Grace that have been manipulated and distorted to preserve the original's tone while offering a new, more ambient take. The album features sound effects and samples of dialogue placed in such a way that they interact with key moments from Times of Grace. The band encourages listeneres to "experiment with different sources, different spaces, different speaker placement, and different volume relationships to bring an added dimension of life and spontaneity to the standard of passive stereo listening." Unlike Times of Grace, Grace was a largely solo endeavor for the band, receiving no production assistance from Steve Albini.

Some publications drew comparison between Grace and Zaireeka by The Flaming Lips, although another Tribes of Neurot album, Cairn, is much closer.

Critical reception

Grace received mostly positive reviews, with some publications saying it can even be listened to by itself. AllMusic writer Steve Huey wrote, "It functions better as background music than as intense listening; for full attention, it's better combined with Times of Grace. Taking the two together underlines the ambition of the project more effectively, and it's a more active and interesting experience." Writing for the BBC, Greg Moffitt said, "Grace itself makes for interesting if uneasy listening; together, the effect can be mind-blowing. It’s a journey that leaves the listener drained."

Track listing

Note
 Original physical releases of Grace left the tracks untitled, but the digital reissue provides the word "Grace" followed by a number and the title of the corresponding song from Times of Grace. For example, track 8 is called "Grace 8 (Descent)".

Personnel

Tribes of Neurot
Scott Kelly
Steve Von Till
Dave Edwardson
Jason Roeder
Noah Landis

Technical personnel
 Brian Jackson − engineering, mixing, mastering
 Dave Clark − mixing
 Dustin Donaldson − mixing

References

1999 albums
Neurosis (band) albums
Albums produced by Steve Albini
Relapse Records albums